The canton of Héricourt-2 is an administrative division of the Haute-Saône department, northeastern France. It was created at the French canton reorganisation which came into effect in March 2015. Its seat is in Héricourt.

It consists of the following communes:
 
Belverne
Champey
Chavanne
Chenebier
Coisevaux
Courmont
Couthenans
Étobon
Héricourt (partly)
Saulnot
Trémoins
Verlans
Villers-sur-Saulnot
Vyans-le-Val

References

Cantons of Haute-Saône